Peppercorn sauce is a culinary cream sauce prepared with peppercorn, which is prepared as a reduction of the cream in the cooking process. Various types of peppercorn can be used in its preparation, such as black, green and pink, among others. Peppercorn sauce may be served with beef steak such as filet mignon and other beef tenderloin cuts, lamb, rack of lamb, chicken and fish dishes, such as those prepared with tuna and salmon.

Some versions use several types of peppercorns in the sauce's preparation, and some may use ingredients that are similar in flavor to but not classified as peppercorns, such as sansho. Peppercorn sauce may be used on dishes served at French bistros and restaurants. Some versions of steak au poivre use a peppercorn sauce in their preparation.

Ingredients
Primary ingredients are typically peppercorns and heavy cream. Additional ingredients may include butter, wine, brandy, such as cognac, shallots, garlic and additional seasonings, such as bay leaf, star anise, tarragon and salt. Some versions may incorporate liquor, such as whiskey.

See also
 Steak sauce
 List of sauces

References

White sauces